The Bison Solar Plant, also known as the Rawhide Flats Solar Plant, is a 30 megawatt (MWAC) photovoltaic power station in Larimer County, Colorado located about  north of the town of Wellington.  The plant is notable for being one of the first in the U.S. built to a 1500 Volt system specification.  The electricity is being sold to the Platte River Power Authority (PRPA) under a 25-year power purchase agreement.

Facility details

The plant occupies about  distributed adjacent to PRPA's natural gas and coal-fired Rawhide Energy Station.  It uses 117,120 polycrystalline silicon panels (Model SN-72cell: rated ~310 Wp, ~16% efficiency, 1500 Vdc isolation) that the manufacturer, S-Energy, claims are less susceptible to potential-induced degradation.
The panels are mounted in rows onto single-axis trackers. The rows are organized into 12 blocks, and the electricity produced from each block is connected to the electric grid through a  Samurai Series 1500 Vdc, 2700 kW / 2700 kVA  inverter built by TMEIC.  The boost in system voltage from the previous 1.0 kV standard to 1.5 kV enables the inverter to operate at higher efficiency and reliability, and is expected to reduce overall balance of system costs over the lifetime of the facility.

The project was developed, constructed, and continues to be operated by Boulder-based juwi Inc., the U.S. subsidiary of the German renewable energy company juwi AG.  Construction began in February 2016, and commercial operation began in October 2016.  The project was financed and is owned by PSEG Solar Source, a subsidiary of New Jersey's Public Service Enterprise Group.  The completed facility cost about US$54 million.

On February 14, 2019 PRPA announced that it entered an agreement to add another 20 MW of solar photovoltaic generating capacity at the site, anticipated to be online in early 2020.    The addition will include 2 MW of lithium-ion battery storage.

Electricity production

See also

 Comanche Solar Project
 Solar power in Colorado
 Solar power in the United States
 Renewable energy in the United States
 Renewable portfolio standard

References

Buildings and structures in Larimer County, Colorado
Photovoltaic power stations in Colorado
Photovoltaic power stations in the United States
Energy infrastructure completed in 2016
Public Service Enterprise Group